Children's Specialized Hospital (CSH) is a children's rehabilitation hospital in New Brunswick, New Jersey. It has 140 beds. Founded in 1891, the hospital supports a wide range of research with five core areas of research focus - autism, mobility, cognition, brain injury, and chronic illness. It treats infants, children, teens, and young adults up until the age of 21. Its largest campus is in New Brunswick campus which is a member of the greater Children's Academic Health Campus.

History

Early history
The hospital was founded in the summer of 1891 in Westfield, New Jersey. On June 30, 1891, local residents held a meeting discussing how to help local children living in the tenements, and organized into a board of managers with William G. Peckham and Laura Thurston Peckham organizing. Laura Peckham became president. They raised money from local churches, and the hospital opened at Levi Cory House at Mountain Avenue and New Providence Road on July 15, 1892. 59 city children stayed at the home over the summer, with two-week stays each. The home became a hospital as well, when it became apparent many of the children needed medical attention. The hospital filed a certificate of incorporation on April 4, 1893 as Children's Country Home. It later moved to New Providence Road in Mountainside in 1896. In 1962, it became Children's Specialized Hospital. In 1988, it founded its Pediatric Long Term Care Unit for 25 children, and also opened the hospital's Outpatient Center in Fanwood. Children's Specialized Hospital joined the Robert Wood Johnson Health System in 1999.

Later history
In 2000, the hospital became responsible for the Rosemary Cuccaro Pediatric Medical Day Care Center in Elizabeth.

Around 2010, the hospital developed a program to treat babies with neonatal abstinence syndrome (NAS), with about 12 to 15 babies treated a year. By 2015, other programs included treating "complex physical disabilities like brain and spinal cord injuries, to developmental and behavioral issues like autism and mental health."

In 2011, the hospital had a number of entertainers visit patients and staff. They included the Midtown Men, which were from the original cast of Jersey Boys.

In 2012, the hospital released research showing that six underserved communities in New Jersey cities had higher rates of autism. The test involved the screening of 1,000 children from Newark, Plainfield, Elizabeth, Trenton, New Brunswick and Bridgeton, and was funded by the New Jersey Governor's Council for Medical Research and Treatment of Autism.

In 2014, L’Oreal raised $625,000 for the Children's Specialized Hospital Foundation, with the funds to be support the expansion of the PSE&G Children's Specialized Hospital. It allowed eight beds to be added to the 60-bed inpatient hospital in New Brunswick.

Around 2011, the hospital began focusing a lot on research into rehabilitation in five big areas: autism, mobility, cognition, brain injury, and chronic illness. By 2016, the hospital was doing research with the Kessler Foundation (of the Kessler Institute for Rehabilitation) in conjunction with the New Jersey Department of Education to study in-patient stay outcomes at school after discharge from the hospital. It also had around 60 different research projects going, studying topics such as autism and eksoskeletons to help with walking.

Current locations

By 2010, had 13 locations in the state, with facilities handling both inpatient and outpatient, medical day care, long-term care, and specialty care.

It had 13 locations in New Jersey in 2016. These were in Mountainside, Fanwood, two in New Brunswick, Roselle Park, two in Toms River, Newark, Egg Harbor Township, Hamilton, Clifton, Bayonne, and Warren.

PSE&G Children's Specialized Hospital 
The largest of the Children's Specialized Hospital locations, this inpatient acute care hospital features 140 beds. PSE&G Children's Specialized Hospital is located adjacent to The Bristol Myers Squibb Children's Hospital, the Child Health Institute, and Robert Wood Johnson University Hospital.

Rady Children's Hospital Partnership 
In 2019, Children's Specialized Hospital announced a partnership with Rady Children's Hospital, San Diego CA. The partnership helps to establish the first inpatient children's chronic pain program in Southern California. The program helps to provide pain relief for children and adolescents without using opioids. The new unit is branded with CSH's branding and the unit follows CSH policies on pediatric chronic rehabilitation and pain relief in children and teens up to the age of 21.

Services 
Children's Specialized Hospital treats a variety of medical conditions in patients aged 0–21 including:

 Autism
 Spinal cord injuries
 Infant and toddler rehabilitation
 Chronic pain management
 Developmental and behavioral issues
 Pediatric trauma services (ie, ventilator management, tracheostomy care, IV antibiotic administration, wound care)
 Brain injuries
 Physical Therapy
 Lymphedema (swelling due to the accumulation of lymphatic fluid around skin cells)
 Fetal alcohol syndrome
 Cerebral Palsy
 Neuromuscular and genetic disorders (ie, muscular dystrophy, spinal muscular atrophy, Guillain Barre syndrome, neuropathies, myopathies)

See also 

 The Bristol-Myers Squibb Children's Hospital
 RWJBarnabas Health

References

External links

1891 establishments in New Jersey
Hospitals in New Jersey
Hospitals established in 1891
Buildings and structures in New Brunswick, New Jersey
Children's hospitals in the United States
Hospitals in Middlesex County, New Jersey
Rehabilitation hospitals
Hospital buildings completed in 2007
Children's hospitals in New Jersey